Gérard Henri de Vaucouleurs (25 April 1918 – 7 October 1995) was a French astronomer.

Life and career
Born in Paris, he had an early interest in amateur astronomy and received his undergraduate degree in 1939 at the Sorbonne in that city. After military service in World War II, he resumed his pursuit of astronomy. He was married to fellow astronomer Antoinette de Vaucouleurs on October 31, 1944, and the couple would frequently collaborate on astronomical research.

Fluent in English, he spent 1949–51 in England, 1951–57 in Australia, the latter at Mount Stromlo Observatory, 1957–58 at Lowell Observatory in Arizona and 1958–60 at Harvard. In 1960 he was appointed to the University of Texas at Austin, where he spent the rest of his career. He died of a heart attack in his home in Austin at the age of 77.

His earliest work had concerned the planet Mars and while at Harvard he used telescope observations from 1909 to 1958 to study the areographic coordinates of features on the surface of Mars.  His later work focused on the study of galaxies and he co-authored the Third Reference Catalogue of Bright Galaxies with his wife Antoinette (1921-1987), a fellow UT Austin astronomer and lifelong collaborator. 

His specialty included reanalyzing Hubble and Sandage's galaxy atlas and recomputing the distance measurements utilizing a method of averaging many different kinds of metrics such as luminosity, the diameters of ring galaxies, brightest star clusters, etc., in a method he called "spreading the risks." During the 1950s he promoted the idea that galactic clusters are grouped into superclusters.

The de Vaucouleurs modified Hubble sequence is a widely used variant of the standard Hubble sequence.

De Vaucouleurs was awarded the Henry Norris Russell Lectureship by the American Astronomical Society in 1988. He was awarded the Prix Jules Janssen of the Société astronomique de France (Astronomical Society of France) in the same year. He and his wife and longtime collaborator, Antoinette, together produced 400 research and technical papers, 20 books and 100 articles for laymen.

See also
 De Vaucouleurs's law
 Edwin Hubble
 Galaxy color–magnitude diagram
 William Wilson Morgan
 Julien Peridier

References

Further reading

External links
 Oral history interview transcript with Gérard de Vaucouleurs on 7 November 1988, American Institute of Physics, Niels Bohr Library & Archives

 Oral history interview transcript with Gérard de Vaucouleurs on 20 November 1991, American Institute of Physics, Niels Bohr Library & Archives
 Oral history interview transcript with Gérard de Vaucouleurs on 23 November 1991, American Institute of Physics, Niels Bohr Library & Archives

 Obituary: Gerard Henri De Vaucouleurs, 1918-1995
 Biography
 http://nedwww.ipac.caltech.edu/level5/normal_galaxies.html
E. Margaret Burbidge, "Gerard de Vaucouleurs", Biographical Memoirs of the National Academy of Sciences (2002)

Other resources

1918 births
1995 deaths
University of Paris alumni
French emigrants to the United States
Harvard University staff
University of Texas at Austin faculty
Scientists from Paris
20th-century American astronomers
20th-century French astronomers
Members of the United States National Academy of Sciences